Matthew Stirling (1856–1931) was Locomotive Superintendent of the Hull & Barnsley Railway (H&BR).  Matthew Stirling was born in Kilmarnock on 27 November 1856. He was the son of Patrick Stirling, the nephew of James Stirling, and grandson of Robert Stirling – all of whom were also famous mechanical engineers.

Career
Matthew was appointed Locomotive Superintendent of the H&BR on 13 May 1885. His first locomotive design was the H&BR Class B 0-6-0 tender locomotive (1889). This later became LNER Class J23.  A larger and more modern version of the Class B was developed later.  This was designated H&BR Class L, and later became LNER Class J28.  Matthew Stirling's locomotive designs often incorporated the design traditions established by his father, including domeless boilers.  His powerful H&BR Class A (LNER Class Q10) 0-8-0 freight locomotives were heavily used during World War I.

List of locomotive designs

The LNER Class N13s survived into the British Railways era and the last locomotive, No. 69114, was withdrawn in 1956.

Retirement and death
He retired in 1922 when the H&BR was taken over by the North Eastern Railway (NER). Stirling died on 5 October 1931 in Hull, aged 75.

References

External links 
 Matthew Stirling
 Famous Stirling Family Members

1856 births
1931 deaths
Scottish mechanical engineers
Scottish railway mechanical engineers
Locomotive builders and designers
Locomotive superintendents
Hull and Barnsley Railway
People from Kilmarnock